Fromia pacifica is a species of starfish in the genus Fromia. It is in the family Goniasteridae. This species is uncommon, It’s most often found at night on lagoon pinnacles.

References 

pacifica
Animals described in 1921